Claude Ryf (born 18 March 1957) is a retired Swiss football defender and later manager.

Honours
Neuchâtel Xamax
Swiss Super League: 1986–87, 1987–88
Swiss Super Cup: 1987

References

1957 births
Living people
Swiss men's footballers
CS Chênois players
FC Lausanne-Sport players
Neuchâtel Xamax FCS players
FC La Chaux-de-Fonds players
Association football defenders
Switzerland international footballers
Swiss football managers
Étoile Carouge FC managers
Yverdon-Sport FC managers
FC Baden managers
BSC Young Boys managers
Neuchâtel Xamax FCS managers